Quarterback Princess is a 1983 American made-for-television fact-based sports drama film by 20th Century Fox that chronicles the courage and determination of a teenage girl who struggles against sexism and fights to play on her high school football team. It was filmed primarily in McMinnville, Oregon. Because of legal issues, various signs were modified to say "Minnville."

Plot summary 
Tami Maida wants to play quarterback for the high school football team. However, because she is a girl, everyone from the coach to her next door neighbor is against her. Tami goes out to prove that not only can she play football but she can win the state championship.

Not only does Tami succeed, she also becomes the homecoming princess.

Cast 
 Helen Hunt as Tami Maida
 Don Murray as Ralph Maida
 Barbara Babcock as Judy Maida
 Dana Elcar as Mr. Caine
 John Stockwell as Scott Massey
 Daphne Zuniga as Kim Maida
 Mary-Robin Redd as Saleswoman
 Joshua Cadman as Brian
 Severn Darden as Mr. Hobart
 Carmen Argenziano as Ed Ainsworth
 Nancy Parsons as Mrs. Klosterman
 Tim Robbins as Marvin
 Jonna Lee as Tiffany

External links 

1983 television films
1983 films
Films shot in Oregon
Films about women's sports
CBS network films
1980s high school films
American football films
Films directed by Noel Black
1980s English-language films
1980s American films